István Bérczi (1 July 1945 – 10 April 2021) was a Hungarian gymnast. He competed in eight events at the 1972 Summer Olympics.

References

External links
 

1945 births
2021 deaths
Hungarian male artistic gymnasts
Olympic gymnasts of Hungary
Gymnasts at the 1972 Summer Olympics
Sportspeople from Hajdú-Bihar County
Deaths from the COVID-19 pandemic in Hungary
20th-century Hungarian people